This is a list of notable Irish-American musicians.

To be included in this list, the person must have a Wikipedia article and/or references showing the person is Irish American and a notable musician.

Musicians

A–J

 Christina Aguilerasinger-songwriter; Ecuadorian father and Irish-American mother
 (Gustav Elijah Åhr) Lil Peep rapper and singer
 Tori Amos singer-songwriter and musician
 Anastacia singer-songwriter
 Michelle Branch part Irish through her father 
 Laura Branigan singer-songwriter and musician
 Jeff Buckley estranged son of Tim Buckley
 Tim Buckley father was the son of Irish immigrants
 Chris Byrne – pop musician
 Mariah Carey – pop musician
 Aaron Carter singer and Nick Carter's brother
 Nick Carter member of the boy band Backstreet Boys
 Dennis Casey Flogging Molly member
 Ken Casey bass player and vocalist for the Boston-based Celtic punk-rock band Dropkick Murphys
 Celtic Spring family dance and fiddle band
 Kelly Clarkson – pop singer
 Rosemary Clooney – singer and actress
 Kurt Cobain singer-songwriter of the rock band Nirvana
 George M. Cohan singer-songwriter; vaudeville and Broadway theatre performer
 Edward Joseph Collins composer
 Judy Collins – singer/songwriter
 Alice Cooper of partial Irish descent
 Copywrite rapper; mixed Irish and Italian descent
 Billy Corgan singer, lead guitarist of alternative-rock band The Smashing Pumpkins
 Chris Cornell lead singer of rock band Soundgarden
 Frankie Cosmos of Irish descent on her father's side
 Henry Cowell composer
 Auliʻi Cravalho singer and actress of partial Irish descent
 Bing Crosby – singer and actor
 Chris Daughtry American Idol 2006 finalist; lead singer of the rock band Daughtry
 Dennis Day singer
 Lee DeWyze American Idol 2010 winner
 Marié Digby singer-songerwriter
 Howie Dorough member of the boy band Backstreet Boys; Irish father
 Jimmy Dorsey – jazz musician
 Tommy Dorsey – jazz musician
 Hilary Duff – actress and singer/songwriter 
 Billie Eilish – singer-songwriter, director, actress, musician, and first female and youngest artist ever to win all 4 general field categories at the Grammy Awards
 Everlast (born 1969) singer-songwriter; known for his genre-crossing mix of rap and acoustic-based rock music
 Eileen Farrell – opera singer
 Fergie – pop singer
 Michael Fitzpatrick  frontman of Fitz and the Tantrums
 John Fogerty singer-songwriter for rock band Creedence Clearwater Revival
 Mike Fuentes — drummer for Pierce The Veil, born to an Irish American mother
 Vic Fuentes — lead singer and guitarist for Pierce The Veil, born to an Irish American mother
 Judy Garland – singer and actress
 Billy Gibbons guitarist and singer for rock band ZZ Top; has Irish ancestry on both sides of family
 Greg Graffin singer-songwriter for punk-rock band Bad Religion
 Sasha Grey – actress and musician
 Kirk Hammett guitarist for rock band Metallica; Irish father, Filipino mother
 Arthur Hanlon pianist and Latin music musician
 Jack Harlow – rapper
 Matt Heafy lead singer and guitarist for heavy-metal band Trivium; Irish father, Japanese mother
 Jimi Hendrix guitarist, singer.
 Swan Hennessy composer
 Victor Herbert – composer
 James Hetfield lead singer and guitarist for rock band Metallica
 Brent Hinds singer and guitarist for heavy-metal band Mastodon
 Julianne Hough country-music singer and ballroom dancer
 Andy Hurley drummer for rock band Fall Out Boy
 Danny Hutton one of the three lead vocalists in the rock band Three Dog Night
 Jonas Brothers pop-rock band; of Irish descent from their maternal grandfather

K–Z

 Maynard James Keenan – singer/songwriter
 Bill Kelliher guitarist for the heavy-metal band Mastodon; father was an Irish immigrant who moved to New York in the 1950s
 Tori Kelly – singer/songwriter
 Alicia Keys – singer/songwriter
 Dave King – singer/songwriter
 Chris Kirkpatrick former member of the boy band 'N Sync
 Larry Kirwan – punk musician
 Beyoncé Knowles – pop singer
 Ben Kyle singer-songwriter; leader of the Americana band Romantica
 Demi Lovato singer/songwriter and actress of Hispanic, Italian and Irish ancestry 
 Lorna Luft – actress and singer
 Macklemore (Ben Haggerty) – singer/songwriter
 Benji Madden lead guitarist of the pop-punk band Good Charlotte; both parents are Irish
 Joel Madden lead singer of the pop-punk band Good Charlotte; both parents are Irish
 Meaghan Jette Martin actress and singer from television musical film Camp Rock (2008)
 Mike McColgan former lead singer of the Celtic-punk band Dropkick Murphys; vocalist of the punk-rock band Street Dogs
 John McCormack – tenor
 Tim McGraw  singer; both parents have Irish ancestry
 The McGuire Sisters female vocal group of the 1950s
 Katharine McPhee singer; runner-up on American Idol, season 5
 Natalie Merchant singer; mother is of Irish descent
 Patrick Monahan singer with the pop-rock band Train
 Mandy Moore actress and singer; father is Irish
 Jim Morrison singer-songwriter of the rock band The Doors
 Lacey Mosley lead singer of hard-rock band Flyleaf
 Gerry Mulligan – jazz musician
 Dave Mustaine co-founder of the heavy-metal band Megadeth; first lead guitarist for the heavy-metal band Metallica
 James Murphy founder, lead singer, songwriter, musician of LCD Soundsystem
 Willie Nile rock singer-songwriter
 Bradley Nowell lead singer and guitarist for the ska-punk band Sublime
 Virginia O'Brien – actress and singer
 Finneas O'Connell – Singer, songwriter, record producer, musician, and actor with Scottish and Irish ancestry
 Aubrey O'Day member of the female music group Danity Kane
 Chauncey Olcott singer and composer
 Katy Perry her great-great-grandmother was from Eyrecourt, County Galway, Ireland
 Tom Petty – rock musician
 Pink pop-singer
 Robert Pollard singer-songwriter; leader of the alternative-rock band Guided by Voices
 Elvis Presley – singer
 Seth Putnam – musician
 Carmel Quinn – singer
 Christopher "Kid" Reid rapper; Jamaican and Irish descent
 Trent Reznor singer-songwriter, composer and record producer; founder of the industrial-rock band Nine Inch Nails
 Bianca Ryan – singer/songwriter and actress
M.Shadows lead singer of Avenged Sevenfold
Michael Shrieve - drummer of Santana
 Slaine rapper
 Carly Smithson Dublin, Ireland, native who placed sixth on the seventh installment of American Idol; lead singer of the gothic-metal band We Are the Fallen
 Britney Spears – pop singer
 Bruce Springsteen instrumentalist and singer-songwriter
 Gwen Stefani mother is part Irish
 Kevin Shields vocalist and guitarist of My Bloody Valentine
 Patrick Stumplead singer of American rock band Fall Out Boy
 The Rev former drummer for metal band Avenged Sevenfold
 Jessica Sutta member of pop girl group The Pussycat Dolls
 Taylor Swift – pop singer
 Corey Taylorlead singer of heavy metal band Slipknot
 Stuart Michael Thomas film and television composer and producer
 Tinashe – singer of Zimbabwean, Danish, Norwegian and Irish descent
 Justin Timberlake – pop singer and actor
 Chris Trousdale singer
 Shania Twain pop singer
 Danielle White singer from the television singing-competition series American Juniors
 Joseph M. White  tenor
 Robert White  tenor
 Ace Young singer from American Idol

See also

 List of Americans of Irish descent
 Lists of musicians

References

Irish Americans
Irish Americans
Musicians